Bromotrifluoromethane, commonly known as Halon 1301, R13B1, Halon 13B1 or BTM, is an organic halide with the chemical formula CBrF3. It is used for gaseous fire suppression as a far less toxic alternative to bromochloromethane.

Table of physical properties

Uses 

Halon 1301 was developed in a joint venture between the U.S. Army and DuPont in 1954, and introduced as an effective gaseous fire suppression fixed systems agent in the 1960s, and was used around valuable materials, such as aircraft, mainframe computers, and telecommunication switching centers, usually in total flooding systems . It was also widely used in the maritime industry to add a third level of protection should the main and emergency fire pumps become inoperable or ineffective. Halon 1301 was never widely used in portables outside military and spacecraft applications, due to its limited range, and invisible discharge. It does not produce the characteristic white cloud like CO2 and is difficult to direct when fighting large fires. Halon 1301 is ideal for armored vehicles and spacecraft, because it produces fewer toxic by-products than does Halon 1211, which is critical for combat or space conditions where a compartment may not be able to be ventilated immediately. Halon 1301 is widely used by the U.S. Military and NASA in a 2-3/4 lb portable extinguisher with a sealed, disposable cylinder for quick recharging. Other agents such as CO2 and FE-36 (HFC-236fa) wet chemical are largely replacing halon 1301 for environmental concerns. Civilian models in 2-3/4, 3, and 4 lb sizes were also made.

It is considered good practice to avoid all unnecessary exposure to Halon 1301, and to limit exposures to concentrations of 7% and below to 15 minutes. Exposure to Halon 1301 in the 5% to 7% range produces little, if any, noticeable effect. At levels between 7% and 10%, mild central nervous system effects such as dizziness and tingling in the extremities have been reported. In practice, the operators of many Halon 1301 total flooding systems evacuate the space on impending agent discharge.

Halon systems are among the most effective and commonly used fire protection systems used on commercial aircraft.  Halon 1301 is the primary agent used in commercial aviation engine, cargo compartments, and auxiliary power unit fire zones. Efforts to find a suitable replacement for Halon 1301 have not produced a widely accepted replacement.

Bromotrifluoromethane was also used as a filling of the bubble chamber in the neutrino detector Gargamelle.

Before the dangers of Halon 1301 as an ozone depleter were known, many industrial chillers used it as an efficient refrigerant gas.

Chemical reagent
It is a precursor to trifluoromethyltrimethylsilane, a popular trifluoromethylating reagent in organic synthesis.

Alternatives 

Alternatives for normally occupied areas include (PFC-410 or CEA-410), C3F8 (PFC-218 or CEA-308), HCFC Blend A (NAF S-III), HFC-23 (FE 13), HFC-227ea (FM 200), IG-01 (argon), IG-55 (argonite), HFC-125, or HFC-134a. For normally unoccupied areas, the alternatives include carbon dioxide, powdered Aerosol C, CF3I, HCFC-22, HCFC-124, HFC-125, HFC-134a, gelled halocarbon/dry chemical suspension (PGA), blend of inert gas, high expansion foam systems and powdered aerosol (FS 0140), and IG-541 (Inergen).
Perfluorocarbons, i.e., PFCs such as C3F8, have very long atmospheric lifetimes and very high global warming potentials.  Hydrochlorofluorocarbons, i.e., HCFCs including HCFC containing NAF S-III, contain chlorine and are stratospheric ozone layer depleters, although less so than Halon 1301.  Their selection for usage as Halon replacements should consider those factors, and is restricted in some countries.

See also 
 Halon 1211
 Fire extinguisher
 Montreal Protocol

References

External links 
 
 
 MSDS sheet at airliquide.com
 FAA paper on testing cylinders used to store Halon 1301 without breaking their seals (pdf)
 MSDS for bromotrifluoromethane (pdf)
 Basic Facts about Halon 

Halomethanes
Fire suppression agents
Greenhouse gases
Organobromides
Trifluoromethyl compounds